Panfilov District is a district of Jetisu Region in Kazakhstan. The administrative center of the district is the town of Zharkent. As of 2019, the district's population is 129,204.

Demographics

Historic population 
Panfilov District's population has steadily grown since the independence of Kazakhstan, with its population reaching 129,204 as of 2019;

Ethnic groups

References

Districts of Kazakhstan
Almaty Region